The Senate of Canada is the upper house of the Parliament of Canada. Together with the Crown and the House of Commons, they comprise the bicameral legislature of Canada.

The Senate is modelled after the British House of Lords with members appointed by the governor general on the advice of the prime minister. The explicit basis on which appointment is made and the chamber's size is set, at 105 members, is by province or territory assigned to 'divisions'. The Constitution divides provinces of Canada geographically among four regions, which are represented equally. Senatorial appointments were originally for life; since 1965, they have been subject to a mandatory retirement age of 75.

While the Senate is the upper house of parliament and the House of Commons is the lower house, this does not imply the former is more powerful than the latter. It merely entails that its members and officers outrank the members and officers of the Commons in the order of precedence for the purposes of protocol. As a matter of practice and custom, the House of Commons is the dominant chamber. The prime minister and Cabinet are responsible solely to the House of Commons and remain in office only so long as they retain the confidence of that chamber. Parliament is composed of the two houses together with the "Crown-in-Parliament" (i.e. the monarch, represented by the governor general as ex officio viceroy).

The approval of both houses is necessary for legislation to become law, and thus the Senate can reject bills passed by the House of Commons. Between 1867 and 1987, the Senate rejected fewer than two bills per year, but this has increased in more recent years. Although legislation can normally be introduced in either chamber, the majority of government bills originate in the House of Commons, with the Senate acting as the chamber of "sober second thought" (as it was called by John A. Macdonald, Canada's first prime minister).

History
The Senate came into existence in 1867, when the Parliament of the United Kingdom passed the British North America Act 1867 (now entitled the Constitution Act, 1867), uniting the Province of Canada (as two separate provinces, Quebec and Ontario), Nova Scotia and New Brunswick into a single federal Dominion. The Canadian parliament was based on the Westminster system (that is, the model of the Parliament of the United Kingdom). Canada's first prime minister, Sir John A. Macdonald, described the Senate as a body of "sober second thought" that would curb the "democratic excesses" of the elected House of Commons and provide regional representation. He believed that if the House of Commons properly represented the population, the upper chamber should represent the regions. It was not meant to be more than a revising body or a brake on the House of Commons. Therefore, it was deliberately made an appointed house, since an elected Senate might prove too popular and too powerful and be able to block the will of the House of Commons.

In 2008 the Canadian Heraldic Authority granted the Senate, as an institution, a coat of arms composed of a depiction of the chamber's mace (representing the monarch's authority in the upper chamber) behind the escutcheon of the Arms of Canada.

Senate reform
Discussion of Senate reform dates back to at least 1874, but to date there has been no meaningful change.

In 1927, The Famous Five Canadian women asked the Supreme Court to determine whether women were eligible to become senators. In the Persons Case, the court unanimously held that women could not become senators since they were not "qualified persons". On appeal, the Judicial Committee of the Privy Council ruled that women were persons, and four months later, Cairine Wilson was appointed to the senate.

In the 1960s, discussion of reform appeared along with the Quiet Revolution and the rise of Western alienation. The first change to the Senate was in 1965, when a mandatory retirement age of 75 years was set. Appointments made before then were for life.

In the 1970s the emphasis was on increased provincial involvement in the senators' appointments.  Since the '70s, there have been at least 28 major proposals for constitutional Senate reform, and all have failed, including the 1987 Meech Lake Accord, and the 1992 Charlottetown Accord.

Starting in the 1980s, proposals were put forward to elect senators. After Parliament enacted the National Energy Program Western Canadians called for a Triple-E (elected, equal, and effective) senate. In 1982 the Senate was given a qualified veto over certain constitutional amendments. In 1987 Alberta legislated for the Alberta Senate nominee elections. Results of the 1989 Alberta Senate nominee election were non-binding.

Following the Canadian Senate expenses scandal Prime Minister Stephen Harper declared a moratorium on further appointments. Harper had advocated for an elected Senate for decades, but his proposals were blocked by a 2014 Supreme Court ruling that requires a constitutional amendment approved by a minimum of seven provinces, whose populations together accounted for at least half of the national population.

In 2014 Liberal leader Justin Trudeau expelled all senators from the Liberal caucus and, as prime minister in 2016, created the Independent Advisory Board for Senate Appointments, both of which were attempts to make the Senate less partisan without requiring constitutional change. Members of the board include members from each jurisdiction where there is a vacancy. The prime minister is not bound to accept the board's recommendation. Some provinces refused to participate, stating that it would make the situation worse by lending the Senate some legitimacy. Since this new appointments process was launched in 2016, 52 new senators, all selected under this procedure, were appointed to fill vacancies. All Canadians may now apply directly for a Senate appointment at any time, or nominate someone they believe meets the merit criteria.

Chamber and offices

The original Senate chamber was lost to the fire that consumed the Parliament Buildings in 1916. The Senate then sat in the mineral room of what is today the Canadian Museum of Nature until 1922, when it relocated to Parliament Hill. With the Centre Block undergoing renovations, temporary chambers have been constructed in the Senate of Canada Building, where the Senate began meeting in 2019.

There are chairs and desks on both sides of the chamber, divided by a centre aisle. A public gallery is above the chamber. The dais of the speaker is at one end of the chamber, and includes the new royal thrones, made in part from English walnut from Windsor Great Park. Outside of Parliament Hill, most senators have offices in the Victoria Building across Wellington Street.

Composition

Qualifications

Senators are appointed by the governor general via the recommendation of the prime minister. Traditionally, members of the prime minister's party were chosen. The constitution requires that a person be a "Subject of the Queen", between 30 and 75 years of age and a resident of the province or territory for which they are appointed, to become a senator. Senators must also own property worth at least $4,000 above their debts and liabilities, a rule introduced to ensure senators were not beholden to economic vagaries and turmoil. There is a mandatory retirement age of 75. A sitting senator is disqualified from holding office if they:

fail to attend two consecutive sessions of the Senate;
become a subject or citizen of a foreign power;
file for bankruptcy;
are convicted of treason or an indictable offence; or
cease to be qualified in respect of property or of residence (except where required to stay in Ottawa because they hold a government office).

Representation
Each province and territory is entitled to its number of Senate seats specified in section 22. That section divides most of the provinces of Canada geographically among four regions, with one province and all three territories remaining outside any division. The divisions have equal representation of 24 senators each: Western Canada, Ontario, Quebec, and the Maritimes. The Western division comprises British Columbia, Alberta, Saskatchewan and Manitoba, each having 6 seats. The Maritimes division comprises New Brunswick and Nova Scotia, who each have 10 seats, and Prince Edward Island, who has 4 seats. Newfoundland and Labrador is represented by six senators. The Northwest Territories, Yukon and Nunavut have one senator each. 

Quebec senators are the only ones to be assigned to specific districts within their province. This rule was adopted to ensure that both French- and English-speakers from Quebec were represented appropriately in the Senate.

Like most other upper houses worldwide, the Canadian formula does not use representation by population as a primary criterion for member selection, since this is already done for the House of Commons. Rather, the intent when the formula was struck was to achieve a balance of regional interests and to provide a house of "sober second thought" to check the power of the lower house when necessary. Therefore, the most populous province (Ontario) and two western provinces that were low-population at their accession to the federation and that are within a region are under-represented, while the Maritimes are over-represented. For example, British Columbia, with a population of about five million, sends six senators to Ottawa, whereas Nova Scotia and New Brunswick, both with populations under one million, are entitled to 10 senators each. Only Quebec has a share of senators approximate to its share of the total population.

Senators must possess land worth at least $4,000 and have residency in the province or territory for which they are appointed. In the past, the residency requirement has often been interpreted liberally, with virtually any holding that met the property qualification, including primary residences, second residences, summer homes, investment properties, and undeveloped lots, having been deemed to meet the residency requirement; as long as the senator listed a qualifying property as a residence, no further efforts have typically been undertaken to verify whether they actually resided there in any meaningful way. 

Residency has come under increased scrutiny, particularly as several senators have faced allegations of irregularities in their housing expense claims. In 2013, the Senate's internal economy committee required all senators to provide documents proving their residency in the provinces.

There exists a constitutional provision—section 26 of the Constitution Act, 1867—under which the sovereign may approve the appointment of four or eight extra senators, equally divided among the four regions. The approval is given by the monarch on the advice of the prime minister, and the governor general is instructed to issue the necessary letters patent. This provision has been used only once: in 1990, when Prime Minister Brian Mulroney sought to ensure the passage of a bill creating the Goods and Services Tax (GST). The appointment of eight additional senators allowed a slight majority for the Progressive Conservative Party. There was one unsuccessful attempt to use Section 26, by Prime Minister Alexander Mackenzie in 1874. It was denied by Queen Victoria, on the advice of the British Cabinet. The clause does not result in a permanent increase in the number of Senate seats, however. Instead, an attrition process is applied by which senators leaving office through normal means are not replaced until after their province has returned to its normal number of seats.

Since 1989, the voters of Alberta have elected "senators-in-waiting", or nominees for the province's Senate seats. These elections, however, are not held pursuant to any federal constitutional or legal provision; thus, the prime minister is not required to recommend the nominees for appointment. Only three senators-in-waiting have been appointed to the Senate: the first was Stan Waters, who was appointed in 1990 on the recommendation of Brian Mulroney; the second was Bert Brown, elected a senator-in-waiting in 1998 and 2004, and appointed to the Senate in 2007 on the recommendation of Prime Minister Stephen Harper; and the third was Betty Unger, elected in 2004 and appointed in 2012.

The base annual salary of a senator was $150,600 in 2019, although members may receive additional salaries in right of other offices they hold (for instance, the title of Speaker). Most senators rank immediately above Members of Parliament in the order of precedence, although the speaker is ranked just above the speaker of the House of Commons and both are a few ranks higher than the remaining senators.

Current composition

Notes

Vacancies
There is some debate as to whether there is any requirement for the prime minister to advise the governor general to appoint new senators to fill vacancies as they arise. In 2014, Leader of the Opposition Tom Mulcair argued that there is no constitutional requirement to fill vacancies. Constitutional scholar Peter Hogg has commented that the courts "might be tempted to grant a remedy" if the refusal to recommend appointments caused the Senate to be diminished to such a degree that it could not do its work or serve its constitutional function.

Vancouver lawyer Aniz Alani filed an application for judicial review of Prime Minister Stephen Harper's apparent refusal to advise the appointment of senators to fill existing vacancies in 2014, arguing that the failure to do so violates the Constitution Act, 1867.

On July 24, 2015, Harper announced that he would not be advising the governor general to fill the 22 vacancies in the Senate, preferring that the provinces "come up with a plan of comprehensive reform or to conclude that the only way to deal with the status quo is abolition". He declined to say how long he would allow vacancies to accumulate. Under the Constitution Act, 1867, senators are appointed by the governor general on the advice of the prime minister. If no such advice is forthcoming, according to constitutional scholar Adam Dodek, in "extreme cases, there is no question that the Governor General would be forced to exercise such power [of appointment] without advice".

On December 5, 2015, the new Liberal government announced a new merit-based appointment process, using specific new criteria as to eligibility for the Senate. Independent applicants, not affiliated with any political party, will be approved by a new five-member advisory board (to be in place by year end), a reform that was intended to begin eliminating the partisan nature of the Senate. At the time, there were 22 vacancies in the Senate. On April 12, 2016, seven new senators were sworn in, including Prime Minister Justin Trudeau's hand-picked Representative of the Government in the Senate, Peter Harder.

A series of additional appointments were announced for October and November 2016 that would fill all vacancies. Once these senators were summoned, the independent non-aligned senators became more numerous than either of the party caucuses for the first time in the Senate's history. The independent senator group also grew to include over half the total number of senators.

On December 12, 2018, the four remaining vacancies were filled in Nova Scotia, the Yukon, the Northwest Territories and Ontario.  With these appointments, the Senate had a full complement of senators for the first time in over eight years. Since December 2018, additional senators have retired, resigned or died so the Senate currently has fewer than 105 members again, with 12 vacancies as of November 2022.

Officers

The presiding officer of the Senate is the speaker, who is appointed by the governor general on the advice of the prime minister. The speaker is assisted by a speaker pro tempore ("Current Speaker"), who is elected by the Senate at the beginning of each parliamentary session. If the Speaker is unable to attend, the speaker pro tempore presides instead. Furthermore, the Parliament of Canada Act authorizes the speaker to appoint another senator to temporarily serve. Muriel McQueen Fergusson was the Parliament of Canada's first female speaker, holding the office from 1972 to 1974.

The speaker presides over sittings of the Senate and controls debates by calling on members to speak. Senators may raise a point of order if a rule (or standing order) has been breached, on which the speaker makes a ruling. However, the speaker's decisions are subject to appeal to the whole Senate. When presiding, the speaker remains impartial, while maintaining membership in a political party. Unlike the speaker of the House of Commons, the speaker of the Senate does not hold a casting vote, but, instead, retains the right to vote in the same manner as any other. As of the 42nd Parliament, beginning in December 2015, Senator George Furey presides as Speaker of the Senate.

The senator responsible for steering legislation through the Senate is the representative of the Government in the Senate, who is a senator selected by the prime minister and whose role is to introduce legislation on behalf of the government. The position was created in 2016 to replace the former position of leader of the Government in the Senate. The opposition equivalent is the leader of the Opposition in the Senate is selected by the leader of the Official Opposition. However, if the Official Opposition in the Commons is a different party than the Official Opposition in the Senate (as was the case from 2011 to 2015), then the Senate party chooses its own leader.

Officers of the Senate who are not members include the clerk, the deputy clerk, the law clerk, and several other clerks. These officers advise the speaker and members on the rules and procedure of the Senate. Another officer is the usher of the Black Rod, whose duties include the maintenance of order and security within the Senate chamber. The usher of the Black Rod bears a ceremonial black ebony staff, from which the title "black rod" arises. This position is roughly analogous to that of the sergeant-at-arms in the House of Commons, but the usher's duties are more ceremonial in nature. The responsibility for security and the infrastructure lie with the director general of Parliamentary Precinct Services.

Committees

The Parliament of Canada uses committees for a variety of purposes. Committees consider bills in detail and can make amendments. Other committees scrutinize various government agencies and ministries.

The largest of the Senate committees is the Committee of the Whole, which, as the name suggests, consists of all senators. The Committee of the Whole meets in the chamber of the Senate, but proceeds under slightly modified rules of debate. (For example, there is no limit on the number of speeches a senator may make on a particular motion.) The presiding officer is known as the chairman. The Senate may resolve itself into a Committee of the Whole for a number of purposes, including to consider legislation or to hear testimony from individuals. Nominees to be officers of Parliament often appear before Committee of the Whole to answer questions with respect to their qualifications prior to their appointment.

The Senate also has several standing committees, each of which has responsibility for a particular area of government (for example, finance or transport). These committees consider legislation and conduct special studies on issues referred to them by the Senate and may hold hearings, collect evidence, and report their findings to the Senate. Standing committees consist of between nine and fifteen members each and elect their own chairmen.

Special committees are appointed by the Senate on an ad hoc basis to consider a particular issue. The number of members for a special committee varies, but, the partisan composition would roughly reflect the strength of the parties in the whole Senate. These committees have been struck to study bills (e.g., the Special Senate Committee on Bill C-36 (the Anti-terrorism Act), 2001) or particular issues of concern (e.g., the Special Senate Committee on Illegal Drugs).

Other committees include joint committees, which include both members of the House of Commons and senators. There are currently two joint committees: the Standing Joint Committee on the Scrutiny of Regulations, which considers delegated legislation, and the Standing Joint Committee on the Library of Parliament, which advises the two speakers on the management of the library. Parliament may also establish special joint committees on an ad hoc basis to consider issues of particular interest or importance.

Legislative functions

Although legislation may be introduced in either chamber, most bills originate in the House of Commons. Because the Senate's schedule for debate is more flexible than that of the House of Commons, the government will sometimes introduce particularly complex legislation in the Senate first.

In conformity with the British model, the Senate is not permitted to originate bills imposing taxes or appropriating public funds. Unlike in Britain but similar to the United States, this restriction on the power of the Senate is not merely a matter of convention but is explicitly stated in the Constitution Act, 1867. In addition, the House of Commons may, in effect, override the Senate's refusal to approve an amendment to the Canadian constitution; however, they must wait at least 180 days before exercising this override. Other than these two exceptions, the power of the two Houses of Parliament is theoretically equal; the approval of each is necessary for a bill's passage. In practice, however, the House of Commons is the dominant chamber of parliament, with the Senate very rarely exercising its powers in a manner that opposes the will of the democratically elected chamber. Although the Senate has not vetoed a bill from the House of Commons since 1939, minor changes proposed by the Senate to a bill are usually accepted by the Commons.

The Senate tends to be less partisan and confrontational than the Commons and is more likely to come to a consensus on issues. It also often has more opportunity to study proposed bills in detail either as a whole or in committees. This careful review process is why the Senate is still today called the chamber of "sober second thought", though the term has a slightly different meaning from what it did when used by John A. Macdonald. The format of the Senate allows it to make many small improvements to legislation before its final reading.

The Senate, at times, is more active at reviewing, amending, and even rejecting legislation. In the first 60 years after Confederation, approximately 180 bills were passed by the House of Commons and sent to the Senate that subsequently did not receive Royal Assent, either because they were rejected by the Senate or were passed by the Senate with amendments that were not accepted by the Commons. In contrast, fewer than one-quarter of that number of bills were lost for similar reasons in the sixty-year period from 1928 to 1987. The late 1980s and early 1990s was a period of contention. During this period, the Senate opposed legislation on issues such as the 1988 free trade bill with the US (forcing the Canadian federal election of 1988) and the Goods and Services Tax. In the 1990s, the Senate rejected four pieces of legislation: a bill passed by the Commons restricting abortion (C-43), a proposal to streamline federal agencies (C-93), a bill to redevelop the Lester B. Pearson Airport (C-28), and a bill on profiting from authorship as it relates to crime (C-220). From 2000 to 2013, the Senate rejected 75 bills in total.

In December 2010, the Senate rejected Bill C-311, involving greenhouse gas regulation that would have committed Canada to a 25 per cent reduction in emissions by 2020 and an 80 per cent reduction by 2050. The bill was passed by all the parties except the Conservatives in the House of Commons and was rejected by the majority Conservatives in the Senate on a vote of 43 to 32.

Divorce and other private bills 
Historically, before the passage of the Divorce Act in 1968, there was no divorce legislation in either Quebec or Newfoundland. The only way for couples to get divorced in these provinces was to apply to Parliament for a private bill of divorce. These bills were primarily handled by the Senate, where a special committee would undertake an investigation of a request for a divorce. If the committee found that the request had merit, the marriage would be dissolved by an Act of Parliament. A similar situation existed in Ontario before 1930. This function has not been exercised since 1968 as the Divorce Act provided a uniform statutory basis across Canada accessed through the court system.

However, though increasingly rare, private bills usually commence in the Senate and only upon petition by a private person (natural or legal). In addition to the general stages public bills must go through, private bills also require the Senate to perform some judicial functions to ensure the petitioner's request does not impair rights of other persons.

Investigative functions 
The Senate also performs investigative functions. In the 1960s, the Senate authored the first Canadian reports on media concentration with the Special Senate Subcommittee on Mass Media, or the Davey Commission, since "appointed senators would be better insulated from editorial pressure brought by publishers"; this triggered the formation of press councils. More recent investigations include the Kirby Commissions on health care (as opposed to the Romanow Commission) and mental health care by Senator Michael Kirby and the Final Report on the Canadian News Media in 2006.

Relationship with the Government of Canada 
Unlike the House of Commons, the Senate has no effect in the decision to end the term of the prime minister or of the government. Only the House of Commons may force prime ministers to tender their resignation or to recommend the dissolution of Parliament and issue election writs, by passing a motion of no-confidence or by withdrawing supply. Thus, the Senate's oversight of the government is limited.

The Senate does however, approve the appointment of certain officials and approves the removal of certain officials, in some cases only for cause, and sometimes in conjunction with the House of Commons, usually as a recommendation from the Governor in Council. Officers in this category include the auditor general of Canada, and the Senate must join in the resolution to remove the chief electoral officer of Canada.

Most Cabinet ministers are from the House of Commons. In particular, every prime minister has been a member of the House of Commons since 1896, with the exception of John Turner. Typically, the Cabinet includes only one senator: the leader of the Government in the Senate. Occasionally, when the governing party does not include any members from a particular region, senators are appointed to ministerial positions in order to maintain regional balance in the Cabinet. The most recent example of this was on February 6, 2006, when Stephen Harper advised that Michael Fortier be appointed to serve as both a senator representing the Montreal region, where the minority government had no elected representation, and the Cabinet position of Minister of Public Works and Government Services. Fortier resigned his Senate seat to run (unsuccessfully) for a House of Commons seat in the 2008 general election.

Broadcasting
Unlike the House of Commons, proceedings of the Senate were historically not carried by CPAC, as the upper house long declined to allow its sessions to be televised. On April 25, 2006, Senator Hugh Segal moved that the proceedings of the Senate be televised; the motion was referred to the Senate Standing Committee on Rules, Procedures and the Rights of Parliament for consideration; although the motion was approved in principle, broadcast of Senate proceedings was not actually launched at that time apart from selected committee meetings.

Full broadcast of Senate proceedings began on March 18, 2019, concurrent with the Senate's temporary relocation to the Senate of Canada Building.

See also

Canadian Senate divisions
Canadian Senate expenses scandal
Canadian Senate Page Program
Joint address
List of Canadian Senate appointments by prime minister
List of current Canadian senators
Lists of Canadian senators
Procedural officers and senior officials of the parliament of Canada

References

Further reading

External links

Senate of Canada – official website
Department of Justice. (2004). Constitution Acts, 1867 to 1982.  
Forsey, Eugene. (2003). "How Canadians Govern Themselves."  
The Parliament of Canada. Official Website. 
A Legislative and Historical Overview of the Canadian Senate

 
Government of Canada
Canada

sv:Kanadas parlament#Senaten